The 2012 season of the 3. divisjon, the fourth highest association football league for men in Norway.

Between 22 and 26 games (depending on group size) are played in 12 groups, with 3 points given for wins and 1 for draws. Twelve group winners are promoted to the 2. divisjon.

The 3. divisjon was streamlined to only 12 groups, compared to 24 groups in 2010.

Tables 

Group 1
Drøbak/Frogn – promoted
Sprint-Jeløy
Sarpsborg 08 2
Korsvoll
Hasle-Løren
Fredrikstad 2
Askim
Oslo City
Skeid 2 – relegated
Follo 2
Nesodden 2
Nordstrand – relegated
Holmlia
Trosvik – relegated

Group 2
Skedsmo – promoted
Lillestrøm 2
Ull/Kisa IL 2
Frognerparken – pulled team post-season
Jevnaker
Hønefoss 2
Strømmen 2
Lørenskog 2
Bøler
Eidskog – pulled team post-season
Fjellhamar
Sparta/Bragerøen – gave way for Stoppen
Vestfossen – relegated
Grüner – relegated

Group 3
Lyn – promoted
Modum
Ullern
Mjøndalen 2
Drammen
Nordre Land
Raufoss 2
Asker 2
Lommedalen
Bærum 2
Romsås
Røa – relegated
Vestli – relegated:Frigg 2 – pulled team

Group 4
Eidsvold Turn – promoted
Stjørdals-Blink
Ottestad
Tiller
Flisa
Sander
Hauerseter
Ham-Kam 2
Alvdal
Kongsvinger 2
Funnefoss/Vormsund
Brumunddal 2 – relegated
Moelven – relegated:Nybergsund 2 – pulled team

Group 5
Arendal – promoted
Skarphedin
Herkules
Notodden 2
Sandefjord 2
Pors 2
Runar
Larvik Turn
Tollnes
Flint
Odd 3
Eik-Tønsberg – relegated
Kongsberg – relegated
Skotfoss – relegated

Group 6
Viking 2 – promoted
Staal
Start 2
Vigør
Bryne 2
Brodd
Frøyland 
Donn
Vardeneset
Klepp
Flekkefjord
Madla – relegated
Sola – relegated
Hinna – relegated

Group 7
Arna-Bjørnar – promoted
Haugesund 2
Stord
Os
Åkra
Varegg
Sandnes Ulf 2
Bjarg
Austevoll
Tertnes
Kopervik
Stavanger – relegated
Avaldsnes – relegated
Skjold – relegated

Group 8
Førde – promoted
Florø
Fyllingsdalen 2
Voss
Øystese
Årdal
Sotra
Stryn
Vik
Tornado Måløy
Radøy/Manger
Saga – relegated
Eid – relegated
Bergen Nord – relegated

Group 9
Skarbøvik – promoted
Sunndal
Brattvåg
Herd
Bergsøy
Hødd 2
Averøykameratene
Elnesvågen/Omegn
Stranda
Larsnes/Gursken
Volda
Surnadal
Dahle – relegated
Hareid – relegated

Group 10
Strindheim – promoted
Tynset
Verdal
KIL/Hemne
Steinkjer
NTNUI
Rosenborg 3
Kolstad
Kvik – pulled team post-season
Charlottenlund
Ranheim 2
Tangmoen
Frøya – relegated
Åfjord – relegated

Group 11
Bodø/Glimt 2
Harstad – promoted
Sortland
Sandnessjøen
Mjølner 2 – relegated
Stålkameratene
Lofoten
Mosjøen
Tverlandet
Innstranden
Junkeren
Fauske/Sprint – relegated

Group 12
Bossekop – promoted
Fløya
Lyngen/Karnes
Kirkenes
Hammerfest
Porsanger
Skarp
Norild
Tverrelvdalen
Ishavsbyen
Nordreisa – relegated
Salangen – relegated

References
NFF

Norwegian Third Division seasons
4
Norway
Norway